The earliest cities in history were in the ancient Near East, an area covering roughly that of the modern Middle East: its history began in the 4th millennium BC and ended, depending on the interpretation of the term, either with the conquest by the Achaemenid Empire in the 6th century BC or with that by Alexander the Great in the 4th century BC.

The largest cities of the Bronze Age Near East housed several tens of thousands of people. Memphis in the Early Bronze Age, with some 30,000 inhabitants, was the largest city of the time by far. Ebla is estimated to have had a population of 40,000 inhabitants in the Intermediate Bronze age. Ur in the Middle Bronze Age is estimated to have had some 65,000 inhabitants; Babylon in the Late Bronze Age similarly had a population of some 50,000–60,000. Niniveh had some 20,000–30,000, reaching 100,000 only in the Iron Age (around 700 BC).

In Akkadian and Hittite orthography, URU became a determinative sign denoting a city, or combined with KUR "land" the kingdom or territory controlled by a city, e.g.   "the king of the country of (the city of) Hatti". The KI  determinative is used following place names (toponyms) in both Sumerian and Akkadian.

Mesopotamia

Lower Mesopotamia

(ordered from north to south)

Upper Mesopotamia

(ordered from north to south)

 Urfa
 Shanidar cave
 Urkesh (Urkish) (Tell Mozan)
 Tell Leilan (Shekhna, Shubat-Enlil)
 Tell Arbid
 Harran
 Chagar Bazar
 Mardaman (Bassetki)
 Kahat (Tell Barri)
 Tell Fekheriye (Washukanni?)
 Hadatu (Arslan Tash)
 Carchemish (Djerabis)
 Til Barsip (Tell Ahmar)
 Tell Chuera
 Mumbaqat (Tall Munbāqa, Ekalte)
 Al-Rawda
 Nabada (Tell Beydar)
 Nagar (Tell Brak)
 Telul eth-Thalathat
 Tepe Gawra
 Tell Arpachiyah (Tepe Reshwa)
 Shibaniba (Tell Billa)
 Tarbisu (Sherif Khan)
 Nineveh (Ninua)
 Qatara or Karana (Tell al-Rimah)
 Tell Hamoukar
 Dur Sharrukin (Khorsabad)
 Tell Shemshara  (Shusharra)
 Erbil (Urbilim, Arba-Ilu)
 Kurd Qaburstan (Qabra?)
 Tell Taya
 Tell Hassuna
 Balawat (Imgur-Enlil)
 Tell es-Sweyhat
 Tell Hadidi (Azu)
 Nimrud
 Emar (Tell Meskene)
 Tall Bazi (Armanum?)
 Qal'at Jarmo
 Arrapha
 Kar-Tukulti-Ninurta
 Assur
 Ekallatum
 Nuzi (Yorghan Tepe, Gasur)
 Tell al-Fakhar (Kurruhanni?)
 Tell Taban (Ṭābetu, Ṭābatum)
 Terqa (Tell Ashara)
 Doura Europos
 Mari (Tell Hariri)
 Haradum (Khirbet ed-Diniyeh)
 Tell es Sawwan
 Nerebtum or Kiti (Tell Ishchali)
 Tell Agrab
 Dur-Kurigalzu (Aqar Quf)
 Shaduppum (Tell Harmal)
 Tell al-Dhiba'i 
 Seleucia
 Ctesiphon (Taq Kisra)
 Zenobia (Halabiye)
 Hatra
  Idu
 Rabana-Merquly (Natounia?)

Iran

Anatolia (Turkey)
(ordered from north to south)

The Levant

Arabian Peninsula

Nubia
 Jebel Barkal
 Kerma
 Meroë
 Napata

Horn of Africa
 Adulis
 Aksum (Axum)
 Keskese
 Matara
 Qohaito
 Sembel
 Yeha

Egypt

See also 

 City-state
 Sumerian King List
 Historical urban community sizes
 Short chronology timeline
 List of oldest continuously inhabited cities
Ancient towns in Saudi Arabia
List of Ancient Settlements in the UAE
List of largest metropolitan areas of the Middle East

References

External links 

 Geospatial: Mapping Iraq's Ancient Cities
 Ancient cities grew pretty much like modern ones, say scientists (February 2015), Christian Science Monitor

Near East
 
Ancient Near East
Lists of cities
Ancient history-related lists